Konrad Ragossnig (6 May 1932 – 3 January 2018) was an Austrian classical guitarist and lutenist.

Ragossnig was born in Klagenfurt, Austria. He taught at City of Basel Music Academy, University of Music and Performing Arts, Vienna and the University of Zurich. He was the editor of several books on guitar music such as "Step by step. Basics of Guitar technique in 60 classical and romantic studies", Mainz 2007 and "Guitar Concert Collection", Mainz 2008.

He died in Antwerp, Belgium.

Discography
 1964: L'Anthologie de la guitare (Schubert, Mendelssohn, Giuliani, Sor). RCA Victor 430.159.
 1974: Concertos pour guitare du XVIIIe siècle (Fasch, Krebs, Vivaldi). Vox Musicalis VOX 35050.
 1973: Music for two Guitars (with Walter Feybli). SAGA 5412.
 1975: Musik für Laute (6-LP set). Archiv 2723 061. Reissued as:
 2004 Renaissance Lute Music (4-CD set).  Archiv 476 1840.

Decorations and awards
1961: First Prize at the Concours International de Guitare in Paris
1984: Merit Award of Carinthia
1992: Grand Gold Decoration of Carinthia
1993: Medal of the city of Vienna
1994: Cultural Award of Carinthia
1998: Grand Decoration of Honour in Silver for Services to the Republic of Austria
2003: Austrian Cross of Honour for Science and Art, 1st class

References

External links
http://www.konradragossnig.com
Some photos of LP covers (Oviatt Library Digital Collections)

1932 births
2018 deaths
Austrian classical guitarists
Austrian lutenists
Musicians from Klagenfurt
Recipients of the Austrian Cross of Honour for Science and Art, 1st class
Recipients of the Grand Decoration for Services to the Republic of Austria
Vihuela players
Academic staff of the University of Music and Performing Arts Vienna
Academic staff of the University of Zurich
20th-century classical musicians
20th-century guitarists
20th-century Austrian musicians
20th-century Austrian male musicians
21st-century guitarists
21st-century classical musicians
21st-century Austrian musicians
21st-century male musicians
Male guitarists